The Voice Dominicana is a Dominican singing competition television series created by John de Mol and based on the concept The Voice of Holland. It is also a part of an international series. It is produced by ProCapital Films and Ram Group Global which was premiered via Telesistema 11 on July 4, 2021.

The series employs a panel of four coaches who will critique and guide the artists' performance throughout the season. The original coaching panel for the first season were Juan Magán, Milly Quezada, Nacho and Musicólogo The Libro. The show was renewed for a second season, where Eddy Herrera and Alex Matos were announced as new coaches, replacing Magán and Nacho.

Format 
The show's format features four stages of competition: blind auditions, battle rounds, knockouts, and live performance shows.

Blind auditions 
Each judge has the length of the auditioner's performance (about one minute) to decide if he or she wants that singer on his or her team; if two or more judges want the same singer (as happens frequently), the singer has the final choice of coach. In the first season, the length of each coach's team is 14 members.

Battles 
Each team of singers is mentored and developed by its coach. In the second stage, called the Battle Round, coaches will pair up two of their artists to battle against each other in a duet arrangement, after that the coach had to choose one of them to advance the next round, which is called Knockout Round. After making the decision from the coach, other coaches can steal the losing artists. Each coach can save one losing artist from another team.

Knockouts 
In the third stage, called the Knockout Round, the 8 remaining artists of each team will be pair up with their coach and have a player-killing arrangement. Unlike the Battles, artists have to pick a song (or chosen by his/her coach) and have a solo performance, after which the coach need to choose one of them as a winner and advance to the Live Shows. There is no steal for this round, so the other coaches are not allowed to steal the losing artist to their teams

Live shows 
The winners of the Knockouts will advance to this round. In the week one performance, the arrangement in this round is similar to the knockouts but there has the highest public votes receiver can advance to the next round (U.S. version can bring 2 highest votes artists), and the coach can save one of the remaining artists. And the coming week is the live finale, the top two artists of each team will perform a solo song, and only two artists of all teams can advance to the "final showdown", which all the cumulative votes will be reset in this round. The highest public votes receiver in the "final showdown" will be The Voice winner.

Auditions 
On October 9, 2020, Online registration to join the competition was announced through social media accounts. Other auditions were held in some of the key cities in Dominican Republic as follows:

Coaches and hosts 
On October 7, 2020, it was announced that Luz García will be the presenter of the show. Jhoel López will be the second to be the series' presenter announced from the social media accounts.

Starting on October 8, 2020, coaches for the show were announced to be Juan Magán, Milly Quezada, and Nacho. Musicólogo The Libro was the final coach to be announced during the grand launch of the show.

On April 4, 2022, Eddy Herrera and Alex Matos were announced as new coaches for the second season replacing Juan Magán and Nacho.

On June 9, 2022, it was announced that Ana Beato will be the digital host of the show.

Coaches' advisors

Series overview

References

External links
 Official website of The Voice Dominicana

Dominican Republic
Television franchises
Television shows set in the Dominican Republic